Nantasket Beach is a beach in the town of Hull, Massachusetts.  It is part of the Nantasket Beach Reservation, administered by the state Department of Conservation and Recreation.  The shore has fine, light gray sand and is one of the busiest beaches in Greater Boston.  At low tide, there are acres of tide pools.

Name
The name "Nantasket" is derived from Wampanoag and means "at the strait" "low-tide place" or "where tides meet" as Hull is a peninsula.  Nantasket was settled not long after Plymouth Colony and before Massachusetts Bay. Roger Conant was in the area after leaving the Plymouth Colony and before going to Cape Ann in 1625. Until Hull was incorporated in 1644, English settlers referred to the whole local region as "Nantasket Peninsula."

History
In 1825, Paul Warrick established "The Sportsman Hotel" on Nantasket Avenue. Later, more hotels were built and steamboats made three trips a day between Nantasket Beach and Boston in the 1840s. Ralph Waldo Emerson spent time at Nantasket in July 1841, reflecting on "the beauty of the good" and "the book of flesh and blood". In 1905, an amusement area called Paragon Park was built adjacent to the beach. A carousel built by the Philadelphia Toboggan Company (PTC #85) in 1928 was included. This was closed in 1984.

References

External links

Nantasket Beach Reservation Department of Conservation and Recreation

Landforms of Plymouth County, Massachusetts
Parks in Plymouth County, Massachusetts
Beaches of Massachusetts
Hull, Massachusetts
State parks of Massachusetts